Oreosaurus serranus is a species of lizard in the family Gymnophthalmidae. It is endemic to Colombia.

References

Oreosaurus
Reptiles of Colombia
Endemic fauna of Colombia
Reptiles described in 2017
Taxa named by Santiago J. Sánchez-Pacheco
Taxa named by Pedro M. Sales-Nunes
Taxa named by Miguel Trefaut Rodrigues
Taxa named by Robert W. Murphy